Behind the Front is the debut studio album by American hip hop group Black Eyed Peas released on June 30, 1998 through Interscope Records and will.i.am Music Group.

Background
Most of the tracks were demos for the Grass Roots album, with added verses by new member Taboo. The song "Joints & Jam" appeared on the soundtrack of the movie Bulworth, where it was billed as "Joints & Jams". "Be Free" also features in the film She's All That. On the back cover, "Skit 3" is listed after "Duet", when it actually appears after "Communication". This was their only studio album to be released in a Parental Advisory version and an edited version until the release of Masters Of The Sun Vol. 1. On the edited version's back cover, "Skit 3" is properly listed after "Communication".

Release and promotion
Behind the Front was released for vinyl on June 30, 1998 through Interscope Records, will.i.am's imprint will.i.am Music Group and Universal Music Group.

Three singles from the album were released–double single "Fallin' Up/¿Que Dices?" in December 1997, "Joints & Jam" in November 1998 and the final single "Karma" in April 1999.

In 1997, a music video for the song "Head Bobs" was filmed and finished, however, the band decided to not release the song as a single. Around the same time a music video for the song "Fallin' Up" was also created, however, was decided that the album's first official single would be "Joints & Jam", with its respective music video released. A similar video to "Joints & Jam" was filmed for the song "What It Is", but like "Head Bobs" and "Fallin Up", the song wasn't an official single. The last music video to be released from the album was "Karma", the album's second and final official single. All five music videos were included on the DVD Behind the Bridge to Elephunk (2004).

Critical reception 

Behind the Front received generally favorable reviews from music critics. Matt Conaway of AllMusic gave the album three and ½ stars out of five, stating: "Black Eyed Peas bring some positivity and fun back into hip-hop. Musically there is almost no realm this group does not touch -- right from the jump, the stylistic innocence of "Fallin Up," complete with striking guitar licks, sums up what BEP is all about." Marcus Reeves of Rolling Stone gave the album three out of five stars, stating: "Behind the Front, offers an organic mixture of sampled melodies and live instruments aimed at those of us seeking a little enlightenment with our well-oiled boogie." Tony Green of Jazz Times also proclaimed that the Black Eyed Peas "provide a musical hip-hop shot that rises beyond mere discussions of consciousness" which "sounds, well dope, with a live band accentuated by clever samples."

Track listing 
 All songs produced by will.i.am, except where noted.

Notes
 signitifes a co-producer

Personnel
will.i.am – vocals on all tracks; MPC 3000 on tracks 1–3, 5, 6, 8–14 and 16; Fender Rhodes on tracks 8 and 16; Hammond b3 organ on tracks 2, 10 and 13; Moog on track 9; theremin on track 12; marimbas on track 9; melody phone on track 16
apl.de.ap – vocals on all tracks except 4
Taboo – vocals on all tracks except 4, 7, 9 and 15
Musicians
Kevin Feyen – guitar on tracks 1, 5, 6, and 8–16
Mike Fratantuno – bass on tracks 1–3, 5, 8, 10, 11, 13 and 16
Terrence Yoshiaka – drums on track 5; percussion on tracks 1 and 6
Brian Lapin – Rhodes on tracks 1, 5, 9, 11, 12 and 15; Hammond b3 organ on track 11; bass on track 9; Moog on tracks 9, 11 and 16
Ramy Antoun – congas on track 6
Darell Cross – drums on track 15
J. Curtis – guitar on track 4
DJ Drez – turntables on track 15
Carlos Guacio – Rhodes and bass on track 4
Peter Kim – bass on track 15
DJ Motiv8 – turntables on tracks 3 and 8
Matt Nabours – violin on track 14
Tommy O. – flute on track 14
Paul Poli – turntables on track 3 and 7
Miles Tackett – bass on track 14 and cello on track 5
Guest vocals
Kim Hill – tracks 4, 7 and 11
Dawn Beckman – tracks 2 and 8
Einstien Brown – track 6
Ingrid Dupree – track 3
Redfoo – rap (track 9)
Macy Gray – track 14
Sierra Swan & Planet Swan – track 1

Charts

References

1998 debut albums
Albums produced by will.i.am
A&M Records albums
Interscope Geffen A&M Records albums
Black Eyed Peas albums